David Stuart Elenbaas (born February 20, 1952) is a Canadian former professional ice hockey goaltender who played for the Nova Scotia Voyageurs in the American Hockey League. He won the Harry "Hap" Holmes Memorial Award in 1974, 1975, 1976 and 1977.

External links
 

1952 births
Canadian ice hockey goaltenders
Cornell Big Red men's ice hockey players
Dallas Black Hawks players
Living people
Montreal Canadiens draft picks
Nova Scotia Voyageurs players